Markus Torgeby (born 1976) is a Swedish ultramarathon runner and author. His foot was injured during a high-altitude training and triggered a life crisis. Later, he took four years of self-selected solitude life in a hut in the forests of Jämtland, Northern Sweden. He has published two books: The Runner: Four Years Living and Running in the Wilderness (2015), and Under the Open Skies (2020).

References

Date of birth missing (living people)
Living people
Swedish writers
Swedish runners
1976 births